Fierzë is a town and a former municipality in the Kukës County, northern Albania. At the 2015 local government reform it became a subdivision of the municipality Tropojë. Fierzë sits on the right, northern bank of the Drin, opposite the village Fierzë in Fushë-Arrëz municipality.

The Fierzë municipality had 1607 inhabitants in 2011 (2381 in 2001). This municipality contained the central settlement of Fierzë (913 inhabitants in 2001) and the villages of Degë (387 inhabitants), T’plan (496 inhabitants), Dushaj (168 inhabitants) and Breg-Lumi (417 inhabitants).

The Drin river was dammed above Fierzë to form Lake Fierzë in the 1970s and Lake Koman in the 1980s. The Fierzë dam is the tallest dam in Albania, at 152 metres high. The power plant at Fierzë is one of the most important producers of electricity in the country.

The dammed Drin is not alone in passing through Fierzë. Here the Valbonë joins the Drin from the north and various traffic routes intersect. The most important is the Drin itself. On Lake Koman, there is a daily ferry. During the summer tourist season, two taxi services run between Koman at the other end of the lake to Fierzë and Breg-Lumi. The pier at Breg-Lumi is moved according to the water level of the lake and usually consists of only a small concrete ramp on an unpaved, flat surface. A road links Fierzë, where a bridge crosses the Drin, to the town of Bajram Curri around 15 km to the north and to Fushë-Arrëz in the south which was previously very difficult to reach because of the mountains in the way. The ferry on Lake Fierzë, which goes to Kukës, was already in service in the 1990s.

Remains of Roman buildings and a Roman street have been found in Fierzë. New Catholic churches have been built in Fierzë-Pukë and Breg-Lumi.

References

Former municipalities in Kukës County
Administrative units of Tropojë
Towns in Albania